Mala Vrbica is a village situated in Mladenovac municipality in Serbia.

References

Populated places in Serbia
Open-air museums in Serbia
Šumadija District